Addas was a young Christian slave boy who lived in Taif, a mountainous area south of Mecca, during the times of Muhammad. Originally from Nineveh, supposedly he was the first person from the western province of Taif to convert to Islam.

Biography 
In 619, Muhammad travelled to the town of Taif to preach and escape the persecution of the Quraysh. The town of Taif was occupied predominantly by the Thaqif tribe, who worshiped Lat.

Muhammad met with the chieftains of Taif, Abd Yalil bin Amr bin Umair, and his brothers Mas'ud and Habib. They rejected Muhammad's message and sent the townspeople to throw rocks at Muhammad and chase him out of town. Muhammad was injured and attempted to seek shelter under a wall in an orchard owned by the Meccan brothers 'Utbah and Shaybah.

They instructed their slave, Addas, to offer Muhammad grapes. Muhammad pronounced bismillah over the grapes, and Addas expressed shock at this, stating the people of Arabia do not speak in this manner.

Addas then recognized Muhammad as a prophet and kissed his head, hands, and feet.

See also
List of non-Arab Sahaba

References 

Companions of the Prophet
Arabian slaves and freedmen

Non-Arab companions of the Prophet
Converts to Islam from Christianity